Thomas Commerford (August 1, 1855 in New York City - February 17, 1920 in Chicago) was an American actor on stage and in silent films. He was also known as Tom I. Comberford and T. I. Comberford.

Commerford debuted in the Old Drury Theater, then worked with the troupes of Edwin Arden and Dore Davidson. He appeared in Lincoln J. Carter productions for more than 25 years. In 1913, he began acting in films with Essanay Studios.

Filmography
 The Two Orphans (1911)
 A Summer Adventure (1911)
 His Better Self (1911)
 Under Suspicion (1912)
 The Miller of Burgundy (1912) - Bontemps (Bontempts), billed as T. I. Comberford
 The Girl at the Cupola (1912)
 Just His Luck (1912)
 Pierre of the North (1914)
 The Spirit of the Madonna (1914)
 Yarn a-Tangle (1914)
 Ashes of Hope (1914)
 At Night With a Million (1914)
 At the Foot of the Hill (1914)
 His Stolen Fortune (1914)
 One Wonderful Night (1914) - Earl of Valleford
 The Other Man (1914)
 The Fable of a Night Given Over to Revelry (1915)
 On Trial (1917)
 The Fable of the Uplifter and His Dandy Little Opus'' (1917)

References

External links

1855 births
1920 deaths
American male film actors
American male silent film actors
American film directors
Male actors from New York City
20th-century American male actors